Railway stations in Armenia include:

Maps 
 UN Map
 UNHCR Atlas Map

Stations

Proposed 
 Ashtarak
 Gyumri

See also 
 Armenian Railways
 Rail transport in Europe
 Russian gauge
 South Caucasus Railway
 Transport in Armenia

References

External links

Armenia
Railway stations
Armenia
Railway stations